Compsodrillia senaria is an extinct species of sea snail, a marine gastropod mollusk in the family Pseudomelatomidae, the turrids and allies.

Description
The length of the shell attains 12.4 mm; its diameter 4.2 mm.

Distribution
Fossils have been found in Pliocene strata of the Bowden Formation of Jamaica; also on Saint Thomas; age range: 3.6 to 2.588 Ma

References

 W. P. Woodring. 1928. Miocene Molluscs from Bowden, Jamaica. Part 2: Gastropods and discussion of results . Contributions to the Geology and Palaeontology of the West Indies . Contributions to the Geology and Palaeontology of the West Indies
 A. J. W. Hendy, D. P. Buick, K. V. Bulinski, C. A. Ferguson, and A. I. Miller. 2008. Unpublished census data from Atlantic coastal plain and circum-Caribbean Neogene assemblages and taxonomic opinions.

senaria
Gastropods described in 1928